Queen of the Sea is a 1918 American silent fantasy film released by Fox Film Corporation that was directed by John G. Adolfi and starred Australian swimmer Annette Kellerman. This film is presumed to be lost.

Plot
As described in the trade magazine Exhibitors Herald:
Merilla, Queen of the Sea, finds a book among wreckage at the bottom of the sea which contains a prophesy that she will save four human beings and then receive the reward of a human body of her own with an immortal soul. King Boreas (Law), master of the storms, wrecks many ships and sends his sirens to drag the victims to certain death. Merilla saves the predicted lives, and Boreas confines her in a cave. She is freed by Prince Hero, the fourth life she has saved, who is on his way to meet his betrothed. They fall in love with each other, but Ariela tells them that they must be unselfish. The Prince goes on to meet the Princess, who is really in love with one of her courtiers. Boreas captures the Princess and confines her in the Tower of Knives and Swords, a worse dungeon than the one in which Merilla had been confined. Merilla has received a human body and such a beautiful soul that she resolves to rescue the Princess, even though this will mean the loss of the Prince. She goes to the Tower and reaches the Princess, encourages her, and then walks out on a spider's thread to a point where she can warn the Prince of the great danger. He and his knights come just in time to save them from a horrible fate. The Princess confesses her love for the courtier, and the two couples are then happy in possession of each other.

Cast

Production
Queen of the Sea followed Fox's big budget picture A Daughter of the Gods, another fantasy spectacle designed around Annette Kellerman and her aquatic abilities. Kellerman was well known for stunt dives; at least one high dive was incorporated in the plot of Queen as well as a tight-rope walk, both executed by Kellerman herself. After Queen of the Sea Kellerman would only make two more major motion pictures.

Cast and crew spent two months in 1917 filming on Mount Desert Island in Maine; additional exterior shots were filmed in Bermuda, Jamaica, Florida, Mexico, and California.

Panchromatic film, which provided superior tonal quality but had a problematically short shelf life, was first used in motion pictures for some of the exterior shots on Queen of the Sea.

References

External links 

Several film stills, Jonathan Silent Film Collection, Frank Mt. Pleasant Library Special Collections, Chapman University

1918 films
1910s fantasy films
1910s English-language films
American black-and-white films
American fantasy films
American romantic drama films
American silent feature films
Lost American films
Films about mermaids
20th Century Fox films
1918 lost films
Lost fantasy films
1910s American films
Silent romantic drama films
Silent horror films
Silent American drama films